Hemādri Paṇḍit, popularly known as Hemāḍapanta, was a polymath and a prime minister from 1259 to 1274 C.E. in the regimes of King Mahādev (1259–1271) and King Ramachandra (1271–1309) of Seuna Yādav Dynasty of Devagiri, which ruled in the western and southern part of India. Hemadpant is also the creator of the Hemadpanti architecture.

Origin 
Hemadri Pandit was born in a Deshastha Rigvedi Brahmin (DRB) family<ref>{{cite book|title=Kāḷācyā paḍadyāāḍa , Volume 2|url=https://books.google.com/books?id=Q_wvAAAAMAAJ|page=373|publisher=Marāṭhī Sāhitya Parishada|year=1992|quote=देवगिरी येथे रामचंद्रराव राजा राज्य करीत असता दमरदारीच्या कामावर हेमाद्री ऊर्फ हेमाडपंत' हा देशस्थ ऋग्वेदी ब्राह्मण काम करीत होता.}}</ref> that had its origin in the Hemadri village in the Dakshin Kannada District of Karnataka. As per other sources, Hemadri was born in the southern Kannada speaking regions of the Yadava kingdom in a Kannada Madhyadina Shaka Brahmin family. His father, Kāmadeo, had brought him up in Maharashtra. In Hemadri's biography written by Keshav Appa Padhye, the author has mentioned that Hemadri was a Deshastha Rigvedi of Ashvalayana sutra and Vatsagotri (belonging to the Vatsa Gotra) Panchapravari brāhmaṇa(५: जामदग्ना वत्सास्तेषां पञ्चार्षेयो भार्गवच्यावनाप्नवानौर्वजामदग्नेति, ref. आश्वलायनश्रौतसूत्र). Padhye has mentioned the reference for this information to be the book authored by Hemadri himself, चतुर्वर्गचिंतामणि, or chaturvarga-chintāmaṇi.

 Career 
Hemadri was a diplomat, an administrator, an architect, a poet, and a theologian and scholar. During his prime ministership, the Yadav kingdom reached its zenith; soon after his tenure, the Turkic emperor at Delhi, Alāuddin Khalji, and his successors ended the Yadav rule in southwestern India.

 Writings 
Hemadri wrote the encyclopedic book about dharma, Chaturvarga Chintāmaṇi. It contains, among other subjects, thousands of Vratas along with the modus operandi for performing them.

He wrote the commentary named Āyurveda Rasāyan on Ayurvedic Samhita "Ashtānga Hṛdayam", containing descriptions of various diseases and remedies for them.

A small historical book, Hemādpanti Bakhar is credited to him.

He created Mestakas to standardize procedural parts of the state administration.

 Cultural contributions 
Hemadri introduced use of Modi script for Marāthi (cursive style of writing Marathi) in government correspondence.

He conceived of Hemadpanti architecture of buildings and temples which did not use lime.

He introduced plantation of pearl millet (Bājari) as a staple crop.

He encouraged and supported many artists and writers like Bopadev and studied their books and presented his own criticism.

 References 

 Samasta Maharashtriya Brahman Potshakha (Marathi) by Dr. Abhaykumar Savaji
 Hemadri Athawa Hemadpant (Marathi) by Keshav Appa Padhye
 Maharashtra Saraswat (Marathi) by Vinayakrao Bhave
 Aitihasik Prastavana'' (Marathi) by Vishwanath Kashinath Rajwade

Maharashtra politicians
13th-century Indian writers
Indian Hindus